Stefan Pavlov (born 26 May 1945 in Godech) is a former Bulgarian footballer who played as а midfielder.

Honours
Levski Sofia

 Bulgarian A PFG – 1968, 1970, 1974, 1977
 Bulgarian Cup – 1970, 1971, 1976, 1977

References

External links
 Profile at LevskiSofia.info

1945 births
Living people
Bulgarian footballers
Association football midfielders
First Professional Football League (Bulgaria) players
PFC Levski Sofia players
Akademik Sofia players
PFC Slavia Sofia players
Expatriate footballers in Cyprus